Algeria has competed at every celebration of the Pan Arab Games. Its athletes have won a total of 760 medals.

Medal tables

Medals by Pan Arab Games

Below the table representing all Algerian medals around the games. Till now, Algeria win 760 medals and 217 gold medals.

Medals by sport

Athletes with most medals

Athletics

See also
 Algeria at the Olympics
 Algeria at the African Games
 Algeria at the Paralympics
 Sports in Algeria

References

Pan Arab Games